Carlos Salamanca was the defending champion, but lost in the second round to Teymuraz Gabashvili.
Santiago Giraldo won the final 6–2, 6–4 against Paul Capdeville.

Seeds

Draw

Finals

Top half

Bottom half

References
 Main Draw
 Qualifying Draw

Seguros Bolivar Open- Singles
2013 Singles